Hollow Earth Expedition is a pulp fiction role-playing game set in the fictitious Hollow Earth (see Hollow Earth theory), published by Exile Game Studio. The game has been nominated for several Origins and ENnie awards since its release in 2006. The main rule book is Hollow Earth Expedition.

System
Hollow Earth Expedition uses the Ubiquity rules, which were also created by Exile Game Studio. The main feature of the system is its use of binary dice pool rolls to determine success. Under the default rules, each even number rolled counts as a success, while odd numbers count as nothing. Odd 'nothings' do not cancel out even 'successes', making dice rolling quick and simple. This binary system has also led to the development of special Ubiquity Dice.

Game setting

The surface world
Hollow Earth Expedition is set in the 1930s. On the surface, everything appears as it does in our real world history books, but if you dig a little deeper you encounter secret societies and villainous organizations, many of whom have a vested interest in the Hollow Earth.

Two organizations are detailed in the main rulebook: the Terra Arcana and the Thule Society. Further organizations are listed in the first expansion, Secrets of the Surface World.

The Terra Arcanum is an esoteric society dedicated to keeping the Hollow Earth a secret. They have their foundations deep in the mists of time, and only a few of their current members realize their true origins.

The Thule Society are based on an actual organization associated with the Nazi Party during World War II. In HEX they have a deep interest in getting into the Hollow Earth and the powerful ancient weapons they believe are kept there.

The Hollow Earth
The Hollow Earth boasts a wide selection of beasts and humans. Dinosaurs and other extinct creatures still live and hunt and are hunted by the various human groups who have become stranded in the Hollow Earth over the centuries. Not a great deal of detail is provided about the Hollow Earth in the main book, allowing Game Masters to customize the terrain to suit their campaign.

Mysteries of the Hollow Earth expands a great deal on the denizens of Hollow Earth, including rules for beastmen of various sorts, and provides details such as a map and gazetteer for those GMs who want a more fleshed-out world, rather than the more nebulous "land of mysteries" from the core book.

Mars

Revelations of Mars expands the setting to include the dying and dangerous Red Planet.

Explore a desolate world filled with strange aliens, bizarre creatures, and ancient artifacts buried beneath its shifting sands. Discover xenophobic nomads roaming the wastelands, sky pirates prowling the air in their great flying vessels, and power-hungry warlords fighting over dwindling resources. Take shelter within one of the great walled city-states, and rub shoulders with haughty nobles, devout priests, and greedy merchants who plot and scheme therein.

Products

 Hollow Earth Expedition (also available in Spanish, French and German)
 Game Master Screen
 Secrets of the Surface World Source Book
 Mysteries of the Hollow Earth Source Book
 Perils of the Surface World Source Book (perfect paperback compilation of four adventure modules: Miracle Stone of the Amazon, Frozen City of Terror, Legacy of the Terra Arcanum and Five Talons of the Jade Dragon)
 Revelations of Mars Source Book
 Revelations of Mars GM Screen (also contain 16 page adventure, 'Planet of the Red Death')
 Ubiquity Dice
 Revelations of Mars Ubiquity Dice
 Ubiquity Style Chips for each of the four sourcebooks
 Quick Start Rules and adventures for Free RPG Day 2008-2016

Critical reception

Reviews
Pyramid
Black Gate

Awards

Hollow Earth Expedition

ENnies:
 (2007) Best Cover Art (Silver Award Winner)
 (2007) Best Writing (Nominated)
 (2007) Best Game(Nominated)
 (2007) Product of the Year (Nominated)

Origins:
 (2007) Roleplaying Game of the Year (Nominated)

Hollow Earth Expedition GM Screen

ENnies:
 (2008) Best Accessory (Nominated)

Origins:
 (2008) Game Support (Nominated)

Secrets of the Surface World

ENnies:
 (2008) Best Supplement (Silver Award Winner)

Mysteries of The Hollow Earth

ENnies:
 (2010) Best Supplement (Gold Award Winner)

Perils of the Surface World

ENnies:
 (2011) Best Adventure (for Miracle Stone of the Amazon) (Nominated)

References

External links
Official site at Exile Game Studio

Adaptations of works by Edgar Rice Burroughs
ENnies winners
Historical role-playing games
Hollow Earth in fiction
Role-playing game systems
Role-playing games introduced in 2006
Universal role-playing games
Pulp and noir period role-playing games